Shakeel Ahmed (born 2 November 1970) is an Indian field hockey player. He competed in the 1992 Summer Olympics. He was born in Etawah district of Uttar Pradesh. Currently he is assistant general manager of Air India Lucknow.

References

External links
 

1970 births
Living people
Field hockey players at the 1992 Summer Olympics
Indian male field hockey players
Olympic field hockey players of India
Field hockey players at the 1990 Asian Games
Field hockey players at the 1994 Asian Games
Asian Games medalists in field hockey
Asian Games silver medalists for India
Medalists at the 1990 Asian Games
Medalists at the 1994 Asian Games